Jean-Michel Iribarren (born 13 February 1958) is a French author. He is the author of L'insecte, a monologue in which the AIDS virus speaks and the author denounces the silence that surrounded the death of homosexuals at the beginning of epidemic.

Works

Narratives
 L'Insecte (2000), éditions du Seuil

Poems
 Parce qu'eux (1989), éditions Saint-Germain-des-Près

Acting
 Puissance de la parole (1988), a film by Jean-Luc Godard
 Artificial eyes (1988), a film by Catherine Jouaffre

References

External links
 Jean-Michel Iribarren's website

1958 births
Living people
20th-century French novelists
21st-century French novelists
French gay writers
French LGBT novelists
French male novelists
20th-century French male writers
21st-century French male writers